The Embassy of Ethiopia in Washington, D.C. is the main diplomatic mission of Ethiopia to the United States. The chancery is located at 3506 International Drive Northwest, Washington, D.C., in the Cleveland Park neighborhood. 

Ethiopia additionally maintains a Consulate-General in Los Angeles and St. Paul, Minnesota.

The Ambassador of Ethiopia to the United Statesis H.E Ambassador seleshi Bekele

See also
 Ethiopians in Washington, D.C.

References

External links

 Official site

Diplomatic missions in Washington, D.C.
Washington, D.C.
Ethiopia–United States relations
North Cleveland Park